Veum Church is a parish church of the Church of Norway in Fyresdal Municipality in Vestfold og Telemark county, Norway. It is located in the village of Øyane. It is one of the two churches for the Fyresdal parish which is part of the Øvre Telemark prosti (deanery) in the Diocese of Agder og Telemark. The white, wooden church was built in a long church design in 1863 using plans drawn up by the architect Christian Grosch. The church seats about 180 people.

History
The earliest existing historical records of the church date back to the year 1483, but the first church was likely built around the year 1300. By the end of the 17th century, this stave church was in poor condition and was in constant need of repair, so the old church was torn down and a new church was built on the same site in 1727. The new church was a small, modest, wooden long church which was described as "unsightly" in 1785.

In the mid-1800s, the old Heggland Church was closed and its people were divided between the two nearby churches: Veum Church and Moland Church.  The current Veum Church (at that time) was too small and would need significant renovations and repairs to accommodate the newly enlarged parish. Also, a new main road through the village of Øyane was built around the same time, so it was decided to build a new, larger church in the village, along the new main road. The parish underwent some difficult times around 1850 and there was some strong opposition to moving the church, so there were delays. Thus, the new church wasn't built until 1863. This new wooden long church was based on a standard architectural drawing by Christian Grosch and it was built by a builder named Svenkesen. The new church was consecrated on 14 August 1863. After the new building was completed, the old church was torn down. The new church originally had a rose window over the front door, but it eventually fell into disrepair and was removed. The church was restored in 1957.

Media gallery

See also
List of churches in Agder og Telemark

References

Fyresdal
Churches in Vestfold og Telemark
Long churches in Norway
Wooden churches in Norway
19th-century Church of Norway church buildings
Churches completed in 1863
13th-century establishments in Norway